Franz Kafka, a German-language writer of novels and short stories who is regarded by critics as one of the most influential authors of the 20th century, was trained as a lawyer and later employed by an insurance company, writing only in his spare time.

Fiction

Novels

Short stories

Non-fiction

Diaries and notebooks

Letters
Kafka wrote hundreds of letters to family and close female friends, including his father, his fiancée Felice Bauer, and his youngest sister Ottla.

Essays

Work-related writings

Editions and collections

Works and first publications in German 

He prepared the story collection  (A Hunger Artist) for print, but it was not published until after his death. Brod also published letters, diaries and aphorisms.

Many of Kafka's works have uncertain dates of writing and/or were written over long periods of time. In such cases the year the writing of the work began is used. Year and place of the first publication is shown. For many works the German text is available, for several works also an English translation. It is linked in columns "de" (short for "deutsch", German) and "en" (short for English).

English translations 

German's more flexible word order is one of the problems translating German into other languages. German also uses modal connectives, and syntactic structures which can be translated in more than one way. Kafka did not write in standard High German, but rather in a Praguean German heavily influenced by the Yiddish and Czech languages. This has led philosophers Deleuze and Guattari to describe Kafka's linguistic style as "deterritorialized", characterized by a "withered vocabulary" and an "incorrect syntax".

German sentences also have a different syntactic structure. Unlike English, German is a verb-final language, which places the main verb of a verb string (e.g., "transformed" in "had been transformed") at the end of a phrase. The difference can be seen in the contrast between the original German version of the first sentence in Kafka's "The Metamorphosis":
Als Gregor Samsa eines Morgens aus unruhigen Träumen erwachte, fand er sich in seinem Bett zu einem ungeheuren Ungeziefer verwandelt. (Original)
 As Gregor Samsa one morning from restless dreams awoke, found he himself in his bed into an enormous vermin transformed. (literal word-for-word translation)
"As Gregor Samsa awoke one morning from uneasy dreams he found himself transformed in his bed into a gigantic insect". (Willa Muir, 1933)

Another virtually insurmountable problem facing translators is how to deal with the author's intentional use of ambiguous idioms and words that have several meanings which result in writings difficult to precisely translate. One such instance is found in the first sentence of "The Metamorphosis". English translators have often sought to render the word Ungeziefer as "insect";  in today's German it means vermin. It is sometimes used colloquially to mean "bug" – a very general term, unlike the scientific sounding "insect". Kafka had no intention of labeling Gregor, the protagonist of the story, as any specific thing, but instead wanted to convey Gregor's disgust at his transformation.
Translators have chosen numerous inexact and unsatisfactory ways to represent "[zu einem] ungeheuren Ungeziefer", unable to convey the repetition of the first two syllables and the equal four syllables of the two words in German:
 "gigantic insect" (Muir, 1948)
 "monstrous vermin" (Corngold, 1972, Neugroschel, 1993/1995, Freed, 1996)
 "giant bug" (Underwood, 1981)
 "monstrous insect" (Pasley, 1992)
 "enormous bug" (Appelbaum, 1996)
 "monstrous cockroach" (Hofmann, 2007)
 "large verminous insect" (Williams, 2011)

Another example is Kafka's use of the German noun Verkehr in the final sentence of The Judgment. Literally, Verkehr means intercourse and, as in English, can have either a sexual or non-sexual meaning; in addition, it is used to mean transport or traffic. The sentence can be translated as: "At that moment an unending stream of traffic crossed over the bridge". What gives added weight to the obvious double meaning of 'Verkehr' is Kafka's confession to Brod that when he wrote that final line, he was thinking of "a violent ejaculation".

Selected publications in English

Schocken editions

Other editions

Collaborations

References

Bibliography 

 
 
 
 
 
 
 

Bibliography
Bibliographies by writer
Bibliographies of Czech writers